Jeffrey Mongrain is an American artist, currently a Distinguished Professor at Hunter College, City University of New York.

References

Year of birth missing (living people)
Living people
City University of New York faculty